Hillary Clinton won many primaries, but lost the Democratic Party nomination to Barack Obama during the 2008 United States presidential election.

Campaign developments 2007

Early opposition from two sides

In February 2007, The Los Angeles Times reported that several anti-Clinton organizations, including Stop Her Now and Stop Hillary PAC, were preparing "swiftboating" style attacks against her, with venues to include a documentary film, numerous books, and websites. A top Rudy Giuliani donor, Richard Collins, who has also supported George W. Bush for several years, was central in establishing "Stop Her Now."

CNN reported that 320,000 users joined the Facebook group "Stop Hillary Clinton: (One Million Strong AGAINST Hillary)". The news blog, The Politico gave the membership number as 418,000 members. This group was the largest group for or against a presidential candidate on Facebook; The Politico argued that this happened because "Clinton has had a polarizing effect."

Former Bill Clinton fundraiser and ally David Geffen spoke out against Hillary Clinton in an interview with Maureen Dowd. Geffen stated that Clinton "was overproduced and overscripted." He also stated that, "I don't think anybody believes that in the last six years, all of a sudden Bill Clinton has become a different person [...] Everybody in politics lies, but they do it with such ease, it's troubling." The Clinton campaign responded by stating, "While Senator Obama was denouncing slash and burn politics yesterday, his campaign's finance chair was viciously and personally attacking Senator Clinton and her husband. If Senator Obama is indeed sincere about his repeated claims to change the tone of our politics, he should immediately denounce these remarks, remove Mr. Geffen from his campaign and return his money. While Democrats should engage in a vigorous debate on the issues, there is no place in our party or our politics for the kind of personal insults made by Senator Obama's principal fundraiser."

Accent
While speaking from the pulpit of the First Baptist Church in Selma, Alabama, on March 4, 2007, as part of ceremonies honoring the anniversary of the Selma to Montgomery marches of 1965, Clinton used a broad Southern Drawl during parts of her talk and used speech patterns common to the Southern United States. A Clinton aide pointed out she lived in the Southern United States for 17 years, which could explain the southern accent, and other defenders of Clinton pointed out that the most commonly circulated audio and video clips of her "Southern" speech focused on a segment in which she was reciting the lyrics of a James Cleveland hymn and trying to reproduce its original cadences. On April 20, 2007, while speaking her own words to the annual convention of the National Action Network, she once again temporarily adopted this accent. On April 27, 2007, while speaking at a  campaign event in Greenville, South Carolina, Clinton said that she had split her life among three parts of the country and that her sometimes-Southern accent was a virtue. She joked, "I think America is ready for a multilingual president."

Discussion of Iraq War (first debate)
On April 26, 2007, she appeared with seven other Democratic candidates at the first debate of the campaign, held at South Carolina State University in Orangeburg, South Carolina, and broadcast on MSNBC. Of her initial Senate vote to approve the U.S. role in the Iraq War, she stated, "If I knew then what I know now, I would not have voted that way." She further stated, "If this president does not get us out of Iraq, when I'm president I will."

Threat
On May 4, 2007, a Louisiana State University student was arrested and held on charges of planning an attack against Clinton during a Baton Rouge appearance.

Polling trends
All opinion polls in April 2007 showed Clinton as the Democratic frontrunner, however with different margins: Obama was listed in third place nationwide with 17% and John Edwards in second place with 19% behind Clinton with 41%  according to an Angus-Reid poll, whereas Clinton was listed in first place with 34% and Obama in second place with 29%, ahead of Edwards with only 15% in a Rasmussen-Reports poll. By May 2007, polls were showing the race even tighter, with Rasmussen Reports showing Obama pulling ahead of Clinton 32% to 30%. But on May 24, 2007, a CBS News/NY Times poll showed Clinton, with 46%, 22 points ahead of Obama, with 24%, and 32 points ahead of Edwards, with 14%. Clinton held her lead over the summer; in September a CNN poll showed her leading Obama 46% to 23%, and in October the same poll showed her commanding majority Democratic support, with 51% compared to Obama's 21% and Edwards' 15%.

On May 4, 2007, a Gallup Poll report showed that since the beginning of the year, her favorable-unfavorable ratio had declined from 58% favorable, 40% unfavorable to 45% favorable, 52% unfavorable.

Campaign song
In June 2007, Clinton spoofed the much-talked-about closing scene of "Made in America", the series finale of The Sopranos, with the subject being the voting for her campaign song. The parody shows her entering a diner to Journey's "Don't Stop Believin'", followed by Bill entering but not getting the onion rings he really wants, while daughter Chelsea is unable to parallel park her car. Sopranos cast member Vince Curatola also appears in the skit, mimicking "Man in Members Only" but with his signature Johnny Sack malevolent glare. The screen then goes black.

The campaign song selected was Céline Dion's "You and I", which garnered political criticism from Republicans for being "outsourced" to a Canadian singer; the song was written initially for use in an Air Canada commercial.

Viral videos
Besides the Sopranos spoof, other popular viral videos played a role in the campaign. In March 2007, "Hillary 1984" spliced footage of Clinton into the legendary "1984" Apple Computer television commercial, ending with a plug for Barack Obama's candidacy. In June 2007 Obama was the beneficiary of the very popular "I Got a Crush on Obama" music video, as an attractive young woman suggestively sang his praises. In July 2007 singer and actress Taryn Southern wrote and performed in an answer music video, "Hott4Hill", that earned national media attention for its sexually ambiguous declaration of support for Hillary Clinton's presidential bid. In both cases, the videos were created and produced independently of the Obama and Clinton campaigns. In December 2007 satirical site 23/6 produced two videos "against" Clinton by a purported "SwiftKids for Truth" that made fun of viral videos and negative ads in general. In January 2008, the Clinton campaign disseminated a video targeting the 18- to 29-year-old demographic in hopes of attracting voters away from Obama. According to a Newsweek blogger, Andrew Romano, the ad was created by actual young supporters instead of high-paid media consultants.

First campaign trip with Bill
In early July 2007, Bill Clinton "served as an opening act" for Hillary during a three-day tour. It was the "first joint public campaign appearance for the couple since Hillary Clinton announced her bid for the White House in January."

Later debates
Following the July 12, 2007, Democratic candidates debate at an NAACP convention, a live microphone caught Clinton discussing in private with third-in-the-polls fellow candidate John Edwards how to get future debates limited to fewer candidates: "We've got to cut the number . . . They're not serious."

Release of First Lady records
In July 2007, watchdog group Judicial Watch sued the National Archives over the slow release of documents covering her career as First Lady. Almost 2 million pages of documents held at the Clinton Library had yet to be released from those years, with less than 1 percent having been released. Federal archivists stated that the process is slow due to the need to perform redactions due to the law, and likely would extend past the 2008 presidential election. Clinton had said at the time of the library's opening in 2004 that "everything's going to be available." Political consultants said that the unreleased documents might be a rich source for opposition research against Clinton.

This issue intensified with the October 30, 2007, Democratic debate at Drexel University, where Hillary Clinton came under fire about it from MSNBC moderator Tim Russert and from Democratic opponents. Russert displayed a document signed by President Clinton that specifically requested that certain records and communications involving her not be made public until 2012. When Russert asked Hillary Clinton whether she would lift the presidential order, Hillary Clinton responded by saying, "That's not my decision to make." A concurrent Newsweek investigation stated that Bill Clinton had requested the archivists hold back a large variety of documents. A few days later, Bill Clinton vigorously defended his wife's responses, saying that Russert's question was "breathtakingly misleading" and that Newsweek's article was off the mark, saying, "She was incidental to the letter, it was done five years ago, it was a letter to speed up presidential releases, not to slow them down." Factcheck.org subsequently concluded that Russert's claim was incorrect, that Bill Clinton had released White House records earlier and in greater numbers than his two immediate predecessors, and that there was not much Hillary Clinton could do to speed up the release of records involving her.
However, on March 6, 2008, Federal archivists at the Clinton Presidential Library blocked the release of hundreds of pages of White House papers on pardons that the former president approved, including clemency for fugitive commodities trader Marc Rich, based on guidance provided by Bill Clinton.

Fears of backlash
An August 12, 2007, article described concerns that a Clinton candidacy could lead to a backlash due to fears that she might prove "polarizing." The article states, "A strategist with close ties to leaders in Congress said Democratic Senate candidates in competitive races would be strongly urged to distance themselves from Clinton." According to an online poll, "half of likely voters nationwide said they would never vote for New York Sen. Hillary Clinton."

An October 10, 2007, article in The Hill made the opposite argument stating that Clinton was "not polarizing and highly electable. You didn't misread that headline. It is contrary to all current conventional wisdom. It is also true – supported not only by recent national polling data but by most polls all year long. Susan Estrich, on p.66 of her 2005 book, The Case for Hillary Clinton argues, "Hillary Clinton is not polarizing; her competence is accepted."

Unveiling of health care plan
On September 17, 2007, Clinton revealed her new American Health Choices Plan, an "individual mandate" universal health care plan that would require health care coverage for all individuals. Clinton explained individuals can keep their current employer-based coverage, or choose an expanded version of Medicare or federal employee health plans. The projected cost of the plan is $110 billion annually and will require all employers to cover their employees' health insurance or contribute to the costs of their employees' health insurance coverage; tax credits will be provided to companies with fewer than 25 employees to help cover costs. She proposed to pay for the plan by cutting government medical costs and by not extending the Bush tax cuts to those making over $250,000 a year.

Clinton emphasized that this was not a reprise of the failed 1993 Clinton health care plan, saying it reflected her experiences and now involved no new government bureaucracy, but Republican opponents disagreed and immediately dubbed it "Hillarycare 2.0". However, many of the health care industry groups that had opposed and funded attacks upon the 1993 plan, were now contributors to Clinton campaigns. Meanwhile, Elizabeth Edwards, wife of fellow Democratic candidate John Edwards, said it was too imitative of Edwards' plan, which had come out seven months earlier.

$5,000 for every baby
In September 2007, Clinton suggested that every newborn baby receive $5,000 upon reaching their 18th birthday. Clinton said that with this money, "they will be able to access it to go to college or maybe they will be able to make that downpayment on their first home". In October 2007, Clinton withdrew this proposal and according to USA Today stated that "it was just an idea and not a policy proposal".

Advertisement on care for 9/11 workers
On October 4, 2007, Clinton's campaign began airing television advertisements in Iowa and New Hampshire. The advertisement dealt with Clinton's legislative efforts to address the Ground Zero illness issues of clean-up workers at "the Pile" site of the former World Trade Center. The ad, filmed in black-and-white, shows an earnest-looking Clinton wearing a paper mask. The voiceover says, "She stood by Ground Zero workers who sacrificed their health after so many sacrificed their lives, and kept standing 'til the administration took action."  The ad referred to Clinton's Congressional effort to secure additional funding and medical care for workers who have suffered Ground Zero illnesses, such as cancer and sarcoidosis.

Debate performance in Philadelphia
During the course of the 2007 Democratic debates Clinton had established a reputation, even amongst her ideological opponents such as Rich Lowry, as a very solid debater who never made mistakes.
However, at the October 30, 2007, MSNBC Democratic debate at Drexel University in Philadelphia, Clinton was the subject of two hours of near-continuous attacks from her Democratic rivals as well as pointed questioning from moderator Tim Russert.
This was not unexpected, as leading up to the debate, Clinton had assumed a wide lead in many polls, rival Barack Obama had indicated that he was now going to be more aggressive in pointing out differences between himself and Clinton, and another leading rival John Edwards had also been increasing his statements against Clinton. Adam Nagourney of The New York Times called it "the most eagerly anticipated forum of this year."

In the debate, Clinton suffered her possible first major campaign setback when she engaged in what reporters for The Washington Post termed "a rare night of fumbles," including statements that Jake Tapper of ABC News termed "obfuscatory and less than forthright," making for what Roger Simon of The Politico called "the worst performance of her entire campaign" in which "for two hours she dodged and weaved, parsed and stonewalled."
Clinton refused to commit to a position on Social Security, Illegal Immigration, the war in Iraq and the New York Governor Eliot Spitzer's bill to deliver driver's licenses to illegal immigrants. Her response on the last issue brought the most criticism, with opponent Senator Christopher Dodd and Edwards immediately saying she had contradicted herself, an assessment echoed by Margaret Carlson of Bloomberg News, who wrote that "In the course of two minutes, she gave two different answers while trying to give none at all."

Clinton's own supporters conceded that her performance had not been very good. The following day, however, the Clinton campaign assembled and released a short video entitled "The Politics of Pile On", which showed her debate opponents mentioning her by name over and over. Furthermore, during a November 1 speech at her alma mater Wellesley College, she said that "In so many ways, this all-women's college prepared me to compete in the all-boys' club of presidential politics." This, combined with comments made by some supporters, including remarks by Clinton campaign manager Mark Penn against moderator Russert, led pundits to believe she was playing the "gender card". This in turn led to another round of criticism of Clinton, who had previously stressed her toughness as being one of her strengths as a potential president; Obama pointed out that he had never complained that attacks on him were due to his being African-American. On November 2, Clinton issued a clarification, stating "I don't think they're picking on me because I'm a woman, I think they're picking on me because I'm winning.". Meanwhile, the Edwards campaign assembled and released a video of Clinton's contradictory debate remarks entitled "The Politics of Parsing", which Daily Kos termed "devastating". A CNN/Opinion Research Corporation national poll in the wake of the debate and its attendant publicity found Clinton with a reduced but still substantial lead over Obama and Edwards, while an NBC/Wall Street Journal national poll found her lead to be unaffected; a WNBC-TV/Marist poll found her lead slipping in first primary state New Hampshire.
A week after the debate, Clinton said, "I wasn't at my best the other night. We've had a bunch of debates and I wouldn't rank that up in my very top list," but defended her desire to give nuanced responses to questions and reiterated that gender was not an issue in terms of being subjected to political attacks.

Prompted Queries
On November 12, 2007, the New York Times reported that "At two campaign events in Iowa this year, aides to Senator Hillary Rodham Clinton encouraged audience members to ask her specific questions, a tactic that drew criticism from an opponent for the Democratic presidential nomination and led her yesterday to promise that it would not happen again." In response, Clinton remarked, 'It was news to me [...] and neither I nor my campaign approve of that, and it will certainly not be tolerated.'"

Las Vegas debate
At the next Democratic debate at University of Nevada, Las Vegas, on November 15, Clinton rebounded to previous form, aggressively combating Obama's and Edwards' attacks. Democratic strategist Garry South said, "To the degree she might have been stumbling in the last debate, she regained her footing tonight," while ABC News said, "After her roughest two weeks on the presidential campaign trail, [Clinton] showed up on a debate stage in Las Vegas ... with a new aggressive game plan and appeared to successfully get her campaign ship back on course." Her answer to the previously troublesome question of supporting driver's licenses for illegal immigrants was now given in one word: "No."

New Hampshire campaign office hostage-taking

On November 30, 2007, a man identified as 47-year-old Leeland Eisenberg, armed with road flares strapped to his chest which he claimed were a bomb, entered a Clinton presidential campaign office in Rochester, New Hampshire. He took hostage the six people in it, and requested to speak to Clinton, believing she could assist him in gaining psychiatric help. Two hostages were released early on, a woman and her infant. Two subsequent hostages were released by Eisenberg during the first 90 minutes of the crisis and the final two Clinton staffers managed to escape the building on their own accord after more than five hours of being held against their will. The standoff ended with Eisenberg's surrender about six hours after the incident began.

At the time of the event, Clinton was in the Washington D.C. area, scheduled to speak at a Democratic National Committee meeting in Vienna, Virginia; she canceled her appearances at public events for the remainder of the day. That evening she flew to Rochester in order to meet with and comfort the hostages, praise the law enforcement officials who handled the situation, and vow not to change her campaign style due to the incident.

December 2007: A tightening contest
By early December 2007, the race between her and Obama had tightened up, especially in the early caucus and primary states of Iowa, New Hampshire, and South Carolina. With real voting less than a month away, Clinton brought into Iowa her daughter Chelsea and a very rare campaign appearance from her 88-year-old mother Dorothy Rodham. Veteran political observers such as Bloomberg News' Al Hunt reported that "things are tense in Hillaryland these days," that the camps of Clinton and her husband were at odds, and that the campaign's "plan A" of being the dominating, inevitable, establishment candidate was at risk of failing.

On December 13, 2007, Bill Shaheen, co-chairman of the Clinton campaign in New Hampshire, resigned his position after saying that Obama's admission of past drug use would hurt his chances in a general election matchup: "The Republicans are not going to give up without a fight ... and one of the things they're certainly going to jump on is his drug use ... It'll be, 'When was the last time? Did you ever give drugs to anyone? Did you sell them to anyone?' There are so many openings for Republican dirty tricks. It's hard to overcome." Shaheen, husband of former Governor of New Hampshire Jeanne Shaheen, apologized for his comments. In addition he indicated that "they were not authorized by the campaign in any way." The final Democratic debate before the caucuses was held the same day by the Des Moines Register; it was peaceful and polite among all candidates there.

The two most influential newspaper endorsements for the early states were split:  Clinton gain the endorsement of The Des Moines Register, which had endorsed Edwards in 2004, while Obama gained the endorsement of the circulated-in-New Hampshire Boston Globe. Bill Clinton assumed a more central role in his wife's campaign, trying to focus the day-to-day message on her being a "change" agent, while sometimes getting her campaign into further difficulties with his public statements.

By mid-month, prompted by continued high negative ratings in polls, Clinton staged an explicit "likability" drive, using testimonials from friends and constituents on the campaign trail and on a new "The Hillary I Know" website. When the close proximity of the first contests to the holidays led to many candidates putting out Christmas videos – allowing them to keep presenting their message but in a more appropriate setting — Clinton chose one that showed her wrapping various "gifts" she would give the country, such as "universal health care" and "bring troops home", with a bit of humor added when she momentarily could not locate "universal pre-K". It was one of the most issue-oriented of the candidate holiday videos.

Caucuses and primaries 2008

Iowa
In the initial delegate selection event of 2008, she placed third with 29.45 percent of the state delegate selections in the January 3, Iowa Democratic caucus to Obama's 37.58 percent and Edwards' 29.75 percent. In terms of the actual number of delegates that would later be selected to the national convention, the difference between the top three candidates was minor, with Clinton possibly ahead of Edwards. Nevertheless, in terms of damaging her image as the "inevitable" leader in the race and in giving Obama considerable momentum, this was a major blow to Clinton's campaign. She remained upbeat in her remarks that night, saying that "This race begins tonight and ends when Democrats throughout America have their say. Our campaign was built for a marathon, and we have the resources to run a national race in the weeks ahead." The following day, reports described "panic" among some Clinton donors; some Clinton supporters began questioning the soundness of her strategy and the ability of her top campaign advisors, with chief strategist Mark Penn the focus of particular criticism.

New Hampshire

Polling showed a tight race in the days leading up to the New Hampshire primary. While some polls showed a dead heat between Clinton and Obama, January 6 polls conducted by CNN/WMUR-TV and USA Today/Gallup showed Obama jumping ahead by 10 and 13 points respectively after winning Iowa. All of the candidates campaigned in New Hampshire during the four days after the Iowa caucuses, targeting undecided and independent voters in the state.

At the ABC News/WMUR-TV Democratic debate in Manchester on January 5, Clinton, Obama, and Edwards all battled over who best exemplified the buzzword of the campaign, "change", with Obama and Edwards teaming up against Clinton. In one noted exchange, Edwards said that Clinton could not bring change, while he and Obama can. "Any time you speak out powerfully for change, the forces for status quo attack." He made clear that he was referring to Clinton, adding, "I didn't hear these kind of attacks from Senator Clinton while she was ahead. Now that she's not we hear them." Clinton passionately retorted: "Making change is not about what you believe; it's not about a speech you make. It's about working hard. I'm not just running on a promise for change. I'm running on 35 years of change. What we need is somebody who can deliver change. We don't need to be raising false hopes." At another point, when one moderator asked Clinton why polls showed she was less "likeable" than other candidates, particularly Obama, she joked tongue-in-cheek, "Well that hurts my feelings ... but I'll try to go on."

In the wake of the Iowa defeat, the campaign hoped that Bill Clinton could help salvage a win in New Hampshire, where he had achieved a political comeback in his 1992 presidential campaign. As he had in Iowa, the former President campaigned intensively, but his New Hampshire appearances failed to draw large or enthusiastic crowds. On the day before the primary, press reports indicated that Hillary Clinton advisers were pessimistic about the immediate future, thinking it was unlikely she would be able to win either New Hampshire or South Carolina.

That same morning, Clinton became "visibly emotional" at a stop in Portsmouth, when after a friendly question from a voter about how she kept going on the campaign trail, she said, "It's not easy, and I couldn't do it if I just didn't, you know, passionately believe it was the right thing to do."

On election day, January 8, 2008, seven different polls led to a win for Obama, by margins from 5 points to 13 points, with an average of 8.3 points. Elegies were published on the Clinton campaign. Weather was good and voter turnout was reported as heavy all day long, with election officials worried they might run out of ballots; the large turnout was expected to favor Obama. During the day and into the evening there were reports of a major shakeup in Clinton's campaign staff scheduled for the next day, in the wake of an expected loss.

In contrast to expectations, Clinton won New Hampshire gaining about 39 percent of the vote compared to Obama's 36 percent. In her victory remarks to supporters that evening, Clinton said, "I come tonight with a full heart. Over the last week, I listened to you, and in the process I found my own voice." Clinton's win was the first time a woman had ever won a major American party's presidential primary for the purposes of delegate selection. (Shirley Chisholm's prior "win" in New Jersey in 1972 was in a no-delegate-awarding, presidential preference ballot that the major candidates were not listed in and that the only other candidate who was listed had already withdrawn from; the actual delegate selection vote went to George McGovern.)

The day after her win New Hampshire, Chris Matthews appearing on MSNBC's Morning Joe said of Clinton: "I'll be brutal, the reason she's a U.S. senator, the reason she's a candidate for president, the reason she may be a front-runner is her husband messed around. That's how she got to be senator from New York. We keep forgetting it. She didn't win there on her merit." The comments were criticized as unfair by such diverse media figures as Bill O'Reilly, Joy Behar and Gloria Steinem, and led to protests outside NBC's Washington, D.C. studios, as well as a joint letter of complaint to NBC from the National Organization for Women, Feminist Majority and the National Women's Political Caucus. Matthews apologized for the comments on the January 17, 2008 edition of his own MSNBC program, Hardball.

In the following days, media outlets engaged in self-examinatory listing of the many faults of their coverage, while pundits advanced dozens of theories to explain the unexpected result. The reason for the comeback that most captured the public imagination was her humanization in the last days of the campaign, in particular the "likeability" issue being raised in the debate and her moment becoming became "visibly emotional" the day before which resonated with female voters.

Meanwhile, Internet theories sprung questioning the voting and arguing that there were discrepancies between machine-counted votes (which supported Clinton overall) and hand-counted votes (which supported Obama overall). Fifth-place finisher Dennis Kucinich's campaign paid $25,000 to have a recount done of all Democratic ballots cast in the primary, saying "It is imperative that these questions be addressed in the interest of public confidence in the integrity of the election process and the election machinery." On January 16 the New Hampshire Secretary of State's office began the recount. After recounting 23 percent of the state's Democratic primary votes, the Secretary of State announced that no significant difference was found in any candidate's total, and that the oft-discussed discrepancy between hand-counted and machine-counted ballots was solely due to demographic factors.

Maya Angelou
American poet, author, and actress, Maya Angelou recited her poem, "On the Pulse of Morning" at President Bill Clinton's inauguration in 1993, the first poet to do so since Robert Frost at John F. Kennedy's inauguration in 1961. In January 2008, Angelou announced that she wrote a poem for Hillary entitled State Package for Hillary Clinton for The Observer. On the subject of writing the poem, The Guardian stated that, "Angelou is steadfast in her loyalty to Clinton. She said recently: 'I made up my mind 15 years ago that if she ever ran for office I'd be on her wagon' [...] Angelou says that she has had many long telephone conversations with [Oprah] Winfrey on the subject of Obama versus Clinton. 'She thinks he's the best, and I think my woman is the best,' she has explained. 'Oprah is a daughter to me, but she is not my clone.'" On April 30, 2008, Angelou made a public endorsement of Clinton.

Issues of race
Issues of race came to the forefront as campaigning began for the January 26 South Carolina primary, the first to feature large African American participation in the Democratic electorate. First, in the closing stages of the New Hampshire campaign, Bill Clinton had referred to Obama's claim that he has been a staunch opponent of the Iraq War from the beginning as a "fairy tale," which some subsequently thought was a characterization of Obama's entire campaign. The former President called into Al Sharpton's radio show to personally clarify that he respected Obama and believed in his viability.

Around the same time, Hillary Clinton discussed Martin Luther King Jr. and President Lyndon Johnson in an interview for Fox News. She stated that, "I would point to the fact that that Dr. King's dream began to be realized when President Johnson passed the Civil Rights Act of 1964, when he was able to get through Congress something that President Kennedy was hopeful to do, the President before had not even tried, but it took a president to get it done. That dream became a reality, the power of that dream became a real in people's lives because we had a president who said we are going to do it, and actually got it accomplished." Some African-American leaders took this statement as a denigration of the accomplishments of King and the larger Civil Rights Movement. Hillary Clinton blamed Obama for the controversy, claiming his campaign had fanned the flames, a charge which Obama dismissed as "ludicrous". Shortly before, and during, a January 15 Democratic debate in Nevada, Clinton and Obama declared a truce on the matter, with both making reconciliatory statements about race, gender, and each other. However, there was concern that Clinton's support among some African Americans may have been damaged, with SUNY Albany's Debra Dickerson stating "The Clintons have to do something dramatic and symbolic to win back the trust of many African-Americans."

In part the tension resulted from the historical coincidence of the first viable female presidential candidate, and the first viable African American candidate, running against each other in the same nomination race. One South Carolina pastor lamented that he had been waiting all his life for either "first" to happen, and said, "I really hate that they had to run at the same time in the same election. It just makes what should be a wonderful situation very stressful for folk like me. I never imagined you could have too much of a good thing." Clinton acknowledged that she understood the situation: "I wish it didn't have to be a choice. I think a lot of people who are torn between us feel that way. But it is a contest ..." Feminism and the civil rights movement had a long intertwined history in the United States, often working in concert but sometimes opposed; while the bitter 19th century split between Elizabeth Cady Stanton and Frederick Douglass illustrated the latter, the unified opposition to the Supreme Court nomination of Clarence Thomas had exemplified the former. After the Clinton-Obama tension on this matter, one Democrat interviewed by the Financial Times said, "After Iowa, Obama was the post-racial candidate who appealed to all of our better natures. Now he's a black politician and she's a woman. And it is back to politics as usual."

Michigan – maybe
Because of a party dispute over scheduling, the January 15 Michigan primary lost its delegates to the national convention, and all major candidates signed a pledge "not to campaign or participate" in Michigan's primary. The majority of candidates, including Richardson, Edwards and Obama, interpreted the pledge as requiring the removal of their names from the Michigan ballot. Clinton, however, decided to keep her name on the ballot, only agreeing to the "campaign" part of the pledge. Thus, little or no campaigning was done there (in the actual vote, Clinton would win nothing with 55 percent of the vote against 40 percent for an uncommitted slate) and attention instead moved to the January 19 Nevada caucuses.

Later, in the month, Clinton announced that she wanted a Michigan delegation (and Florida's, in the same circumstance) seated at the convention, saying "I hear all the time from people in Florida and Michigan that they want their voices heard in selecting the Democratic nominee. I believe our nominee will need the enthusiastic support of Democrats in these states to win the general election, and so I will ask my Democratic convention delegates to support seating the delegations from Florida and Michigan." This seemed to contradict her previous statement on NH public radio where she said, "Well, you know, it's clear, this election they're having is not going to count for anything." The Obama campaign responded that it was clear these contests were for no delegates and that "it seems like Hillary Clinton will do or say anything to win an election."

Nevada
The Clinton campaign benefited from a surge in fundraising after its New Hampshire win, garnering $6 million in new funds. Robby Mook served as Clinton's state director in Nevada.

In Nevada, Obama gained the valuable endorsement of the Culinary Workers Union, whose 60,000 members staff the casinos and resorts of Las Vegas and elsewhere. Clinton countered by appealing to the Hispanic vote in the state, emphasizing that they were at special risk from the fallout from the subprime mortgage crisis. Meanwhile, a proxy legal battle between Clinton and Obama broke out over the creation of special at-large precincts within nine Las Vegas resorts, which were approved in 2007 to allow casino employees a chance to participate in the caucuses, as many employees could not leave the casinos during voting hours. Clinton supporters said they violated equal protection and one-person-one-vote requirements, and the Nevada State Education Association filed a lawsuit seeking to eliminate the casino caucus sites. The organization did not officially endorse Clinton, but many of its top officials have done so. This led Obama to allege that the suit was filed in order to hurt his chances at the caucuses. "Some of the people who set up the rules apparently didn't think we'd be as competitive as we were and are trying to change them last minute," he said.

On January 17, a federal judge ruled that the casino at-large caucus plan could go ahead. This was seen as a win for Obama because of the Culinary Workers Union endorsement.

To further complicate matters, the major news and polling organizations decided to not do any polls before the Nevada caucuses, fearing the newness of the caucus, the transient nature of Nevada's population, and more fallout from their bad experience in New Hampshire. In one of the few polls that was conducted, the Las Vegas Review-Journal reported that Clinton was ahead by 9 points.

Clinton finished first in the caucuses on January 19, winning 51% of delegates to the state convention compared to 45% for Obama. After the caucuses, there was dispute over which candidate would send more delegates to the national convention. It appeared that Obama won 13 to Clinton's 12, because the apportionment of delegates is based on county totals. Delegates to the national convention will be determined officially at the April 19 state convention, and the Nevada Democratic Party said that it was not necessarily true that state delegate preferences would remain the same by that time.
On January 23, the Obama campaign filed an official letter of complaint with the Nevada Democratic Party charging the Clinton campaign with many violations of party rules during the caucuses, based upon 1,600 complaints they had received. The Clinton camp said the Obama operation was "grasping at straws" and that they had their own complaints about Obama campaign actions during the caucuses.

South Carolina
The issues of race that came to the forefront had no greater effect than where campaigning began for the January 26 South Carolina primary, the first to feature large African American participation in the Democratic electorate. The January 22 CNN/Congressional Black Caucus debate in Myrtle Beach was according to CNN a "debate punctuated by sharp exchanges." Clinton criticized Obama for voting "present" on many occasions while in the Illinois Senate. "It's hard to have a straight up debate with you because you never take responsibility for any vote," she said. Obama said that he was working to help unemployed workers in Chicago while Clinton was "a corporate lawyer sitting on the board at Wal-Mart." He also took issue with statements made on the campaign trail by Bill Clinton, saying "I can't tell who I'm running against sometimes." It was the most-watched primary season debate in cable television news history. In the days after the debate, Hillary Clinton left to campaign in some Super Duper Tuesday states, while Bill Clinton stayed in South Carolina and engaged in a series of exchanges with Obama. Clinton's decision to leave the state was subject to criticism. Hillary aides responded by stating that criticism directed towards Clinton was created in order to "undermine the former president". Edwards stayed clear of the fray in the debate and later said that he represented the "grown-up wing" of the party.

Bill Clinton attracted controversy for his participation in his wife's campaign after a series of attacks made on his part against Obama, which many former Clinton supporters felt to be unfair. While some felt the attacks against Obama may eventually pay off, others felt it would damage Hillary Clinton's presidential prospects and alienate Democratic voters in the general election if she won the nomination. There was also concern that the former President was overshadowing the candidate on the campaign trail. According to CBS, "By injecting himself into the Democratic primary campaign with a series of inflammatory and negative statements, Bill Clinton may have helped his wife's presidential hopes in the long term but at the cost of his reputation with a group of voters that have long been one of his strongest bases of political support." Some critics accused Clinton of "pulling the race card" against Barack Obama.

On January 26, Obama won by a more than two-to-one margin over Clinton, gaining 55 percent of the vote to her 27 percent and Edwards' 18 percent. Bill Clinton had compared Obama's victory to Jesse Jackson's victory in the 1988 South Carolina primary, in which he said "Jackson ran a good campaign. And Obama ran a good campaign here." He would be criticized for these comments because they were widely seen as implying that Obama was "the black candidate. " Hillary Clinton would later apologize for her husband's remarks in front of the State of the Black Union conference. Clinton had already left the state and gave her concession speech from Tennessee State University, where she said she was looking forward to the February 5 Super Duper Tuesday contests.

Kennedy family endorsements
In late 2007, Robert F. Kennedy Jr. and his sisters Kathleen Kennedy Townsend and Kerry Kennedy (children of the late Senator and United States Attorney General, Robert F. Kennedy) announced that they would be endorsing Hillary Clinton.

On January 27, 2008, their cousin Caroline Kennedy (President John F. Kennedy's daughter) announced in a New York Times op-ed piece entitled, "A President Like My Father", that she would endorse Barack Obama in the 2008 U.S. presidential election. On the same day, her uncle Senator Ted Kennedy announced that he would endorse Obama despite appeals by both Clintons not to do so. Senator Kennedy's endorsement was considered among the most influential that any Democrat could get. In particular, it raised the possibility of improving Obama's vote-getting among unions, Hispanics, and traditional base Democrats. It was later followed by an announcement that his son Congressman Patrick Kennedy of Rhode Island's 1st District would also endorse Obama. Obama was also subsequently endorsed by Robert F. Kennedy's widow, Ethel Kennedy, and two of their children, Max Kennedy and Rory Kennedy

In response to these endorsements, Robert, Kathleen, and Kerry wrote in a January 29, 2008, editorial, "By now you may have read or heard that our cousin, Caroline Kennedy, and our uncle, Sen. Edward M. Kennedy, have come out in favor of Sen. Barack Obama. We, however, are supporting Sen. Hillary Rodham Clinton because we believe that she is the strongest candidate for our party and our country." California Governor Arnold Schwarzenegger, a member of the Kennedy family through his marriage to Maria Shriver, an Obama supporter, commented, "What is surprising is that I think for the first time, the family is not in sync [...] three of them have endorsed Barack Obama and three of them have endorsed Hillary Clinton. I think that's the interesting story there." Shriver's brother, Anthony Shriver, supported Clinton as well.

Impact of Bill Clinton

After South Carolina, the Clinton campaign sought to find a "gentler" role for Bill Clinton, whose actions during the South Carolina campaign and earlier was suspected of having polarized the Democrat electorate and harming Hillary Clinton's standing among women, in addition to having contributed to Ted Kennedy's decision to endorse Obama. Congressman Charles Rangel, an outspoken Hillary Clinton supporter, said of Bill Clinton, "He's got to [pull back]. The focus has got to get back on Hillary. For all that he cares about his wife, this has to be her election to win, and it's become too much about his role." By two days after South Carolina, CNN's Candy Crowley reported that there was "a huge wave" of sentiment inside and outside the Clinton campaign that the former President "needs to stop."

Bill Clinton did subsequently maintain a lower profile on the campaign, relying on standard talking points and rarely mentioning Obama by name, or if he did, praising him: "I'm not against anybody. I'm for Hillary ... If you disagree, you have another very attractive choice." Bill Clinton said that in retrospect, "Everything I have said has been factually accurate, but I think the mistake I made was to think I was a spouse just like any other spouse who could defend his candidate. I think I can promote Hillary but not defend her because I was president."

By late February, with Hillary Clinton trailing further behind Obama, one unnamed senior adviser to her campaign said that in hindsight it had been unwise to use Bill Clinton as much as they had, as "his presence, aura and legacy caused national fatigue with the Clintons."

Florida – maybe
The Florida Primary on January 29, like the earlier Michigan one, had had its delegates stripped from it due to its jumping too early in the primary season. The Democratic candidates agreed not to campaign in the state, although unlike Michigan all were on the ballot here. Several days before the primary, Clinton announced that she believed Florida delegates should get seated at the national convention.

Despite no delegates apparently being at stake, over 1.5 million Democrats voted in the primary. Clinton won with 50 percent of the vote, compared to 33 percent for Obama and 14 percent for Edwards. Clinton was in Florida that evening and gave a brief victory speech, saying, "You know, I could not come here to ask in person for your votes. But I am here to thank you for your votes today. This has been a record turnout because Floridians wanted their voices to be heard on the great issues that affect our country and the world."

Super Tuesday

Super Tuesday took place on February 5, 2008, with twenty-two states holding Democratic caucuses or primary elections on this date. It was preceded by two events for Clinton. The first was a debate held at the Kodak Theatre in Los Angeles on January 31 which was notable for its civil tone. The second was Hillary's Voices Across America: A National Town Hall which was broadcast on the Hallmark Channel at 9 pm on February 4. During this time, Clinton also announced that she had loaned her campaign $5 million. Of this loan Clinton commented, "I loaned it because I believe very strongly in this campaign. We had a great month fund-raising in January, broke all records. But my opponent was able to raise more money."

There were a number of issues at stake going into Super Tuesday, with no clear winner assured in the race. One critical factor was the California primary which was deemed the "biggest prize in the Super Tuesday contest: the state delivers 370 delegates for the Democratic candidates." In the California contest, Clinton had gained three important endorsements: Congresswoman Maxine Waters, Los Angeles Mayor Antonio Villaraigosa, and San Francisco Mayor Gavin Newsom.

Clinton won nine states on Super Tuesday including important delegate rich ones: the California Primary, 52% to 42%, with 204 delegates for Clinton and 160 for Obama; the New York Primary 57% to 40% with 139 delegates for Clinton and 93 for Obama; the New Jersey Primary 54% to 44% with 59 delegates for Clinton and 48 for Obama;
the Arizona Primary 51% to 42% with 31 delegates for Clinton and 25 for Obama; the Arkansas Primary 70% to 20% with 27 delegates for Clinton and 8 for Obama; Oklahoma Primary, 61% to 37%, of which Clinton gained 24 delegates and Obama 14; and Tennessee Primary, 54% to 41%, of which Clinton gained 40 delegates and Obama 28. She also won the Massachusetts Primary 56% to 41%, of which Clinton gained 55 delegates and Obama 38. The Massachusetts Primary was described by The Guardian as a "symbolically important triumph" for Clinton. New Mexico had to postpone declaring a winner in order to conduct a recount. Clinton was announced the winner of New Mexico on February 14. Obama won the primaries in Alabama, Connecticut, Delaware, Illinois, Missouri and Utah. He also won all of the states which held caucuses – Alaska, Colorado, Idaho, Kansas, Minnesota and North Dakota; among the reasons for this were his campaign's fundraising advantage, which allowed him to procure the costly ground operations crucial to success in caucuses. According to CBS News estimates, Obama won 803 pledged delegates on Super Tuesday and Clinton took 799.

Within a few days after Super Tuesday, Clinton raised $10 million from 100,000 donors.

Louisiana, Nebraska, Washington, and Maine
Clinton competed in Washington, with advertising and personal appearances, as well as in Maine, with Bill Clinton going to Louisiana. In Washington, which had the most delegates at stake, Clinton had the endorsements of Senators Patty Murray and Maria Cantwell, but lost Governor Chris Gregoire to Obama. Nebraska was visited by daughter Chelsea Clinton, who talked to students at Creighton University.

On February 9, Clinton lost the Louisiana primary 57% to 36%, the Nebraska caucuses 68% to 32%, and the Washington caucuses 68% to 31%. Across the three states, Obama gaining 84 delegates to Clinton's 45. On February 10, Clinton lost the Maine caucus 59% to 40%. Obama gained 15 delegates to Clinton's 9.

The Potomac primary
The "Potomac primary", with votes cast in Maryland, Virginia, and the District of Columbia, was held on February 12.

Clinton made personal appearances in the District, Maryland, and Virginia. Obama was able to begin his television advertising in the states earlier than Clinton, due to his campaign's fundraising advantage. Clinton lost the D.C. primary 75% to 24%, the Maryland primary 61% to 36%, and the Virginia Primary 64% to 35%.

Clinton herself responded to the loss by stating, "I think everybody knew that he was favored there. My husband lost Maryland when he was running in the primary. We go on. We're ready for the contests that are upcoming. There are hundreds of delegates that will be in play on March 4. We are well organized and well positioned." Regarding a response to Obama's win CNN argued, "for the second election night in a row, Hillary Clinton failed to acknowledge or congratulate Barack Obama after he won the day in dominating fashion." CBS, however, quoted Clinton as telling reporters, 'I want to congratulate Senator Obama on his recent victories and tell him to meet me in Texas, we're ready.'"

On February 14, a national poll by Ipsos-Public Affairs placed Clinton at 46% and Obama at 41%. National polls from Rasmussen and Gallup were released the same day. Rasmussen showed Obama ahead 49–37, and Gallup had the race virtually even, with Obama holding a one-point lead. The same day, Obama passed Clinton in the overall Pollster.com aggregate national poll for the first time during the campaign. NBC News noted that even if Florida and Michigan were included in the tally, Obama led in the total popular vote after the Potomac primary.

Role of superdelegates
Following the Potomac primary, the potential role of superdelegates in deciding the Democratic nomination was heavily discussed. In particular, the possibility of one candidate gaining more pledged delegates from primary and caucus wins, but losing the nomination to the other due to the decisions of superdelegates, made some Democratic leaders uncomfortable. The Clinton camp, behind in pledged delegates, advocated that superdelegates exercise their own judgment in deciding which candidate to back; Clinton campaign worker Geraldine Ferraro argued for this option, with Ferraro stating, "The superdelegates were created to lead, not to follow." The Obama camp, ahead in pledged delegates, advocated that superdelegates follow the will of the voters and back whichever candidate had the most pledged delegates. Some party leaders, such as U.S. Speaker of the House Nancy Pelosi, argued for the latter interpretation, while others such as Democratic National Committee chair Howard Dean argued for the former interpretation.

African American superdelegates previously pledged to Clinton, found themselves under pressure to switch to supporting Obama's historic candidacy; Representative Jesse Jackson Jr. suggested that those staying with Clinton might face Democratic primary challenges in the future. MoveOn.org started an Internet petition to urge superdelegates to "let the voters decide between Clinton and Obama, then support the people's choice."

Clinton was viewed as having an institutional advantage in amassing superdelegates by virtue of her fifteen years of national prominence in party politics. However, Obama had heavily outspent Clinton in previous contributions to superdelegates through their political action committees.

Whether or not Clinton actually could prevail with the help of party-appointed superdelegates was also an increasingly debated question, as Obama gained 47 new superdelegates between Super Tuesday and mid-March, while Clinton lost 7.

Wisconsin and Hawaii
The Wisconsin primary and the Hawaii caucuses were next on the campaign schedule. Chelsea Clinton made appearances at four Wisconsin universities: University of Wisconsin–Milwaukee, University of Wisconsin–Madison, University of Wisconsin–La Crosse, and University of Wisconsin–Eau Claire. WISN-TV noted Chelsea's statement at UW–Milwaukee that, "On the war in Iraq, '[her mother] would end it the first day (in office) if she could,' but acknowledges that it would take about 60 days to come up with a plan to withdraw our troops and set up a workable plan to leave." Chelsea also planned to appear for her mother in Honolulu and in Maui.

Hillary Clinton reduced her already limited scheduled appearances in Wisconsin, with her campaign feeling disadvantaged by Governor of Wisconsin Jim Doyle's endorsement of Obama and the fact that independent voters are able to vote in the state's Democratic primary. Clinton made Obama's refusals to add any additional debates to the campaign schedule a primary focus of her messaging in Wisconsin, saying, "I will meet Senator Obama any place in the state. There's only been one debate between the two of us. This has only been a two person race for a little over two weeks. And I think it's a real disservice to the people of Wisconsin that you haven't had a chance to see the tough questions asked and answered." Obama responded by saying, "We've had 18 debates. Eighteen debates!" Obama outspent Clinton 4–1 in television advertising in the state, and was able to get on the air earlier than Clinton due to his campaign's greater financial strength. Clinton did air a large number of negative ads against Obama in the final days of the campaign.

The most publicized charge which Clinton used against Obama preceding the Wisconsin primary were accusations that he plagiarized portions of his campaign's national co-chair Governor Deval Patrick of Massachusetts. The lines Obama used were in response to charges by Clinton that his campaign offered "speeches but not solutions." The lines Obama used were almost verbatim from portions of a speech made by Patrick in 2006, stating "Don't tell me words don't matter.'I have a dream.' Just words? 'We hold these truths to be self-evident, that all men are created equal.' Just words! 'We have nothing to fear but fear itself.' Just words – just speeches!" Obama stated that he borrowed the lines after being recommend to do so by Patrick who had faced similar attacks that he was only offering talk but not action.

On February 19, Clinton's losing streak to Obama stretched to ten in a row. Obama won the Wisconsin primary 58 percent to 41 percent, with a trend continuing of Clinton losing support in demographics that had previously been most favorable to her, such as women, lower-income families, and people who belong to labor unions. That evening, when Clinton's televised remarks did not include acknowledgment of Obama's victory, he started his own victory remarks before she finished, causing the cable news channels' to switch their live coverage to Obama. Obama also won the Hawaii caucuses overwhelmingly, 76 percent to 24 percent, in the state where he was born, spent much of his childhood, and still has family. The New York Times termed the night's results and demographic trends "grim tidings for Mrs. Clinton," while the Los Angeles Times headlined, "Wisconsin: Beginning of the end for Clinton?" and the Associated Press described her campaign as "fading".

Two days later, the results of the worldwide Democrats Abroad primary were announced, with Obama winning by a wide margin and stretching Clinton's losing streak to eleven.

Ohio, Rhode Island, Texas, and Vermont
The Ohio primary, Rhode Island primary, Texas primary and Texas caucus, and Vermont primary took place on March 4. The delegate-rich Ohio and Texas primaries were considered to be top prizes for both candidates: Ohio offers 141 pledged delegates and Texas 193. A number of news organizations, most notably cable television network Fox News named the March 4 primaries and caucuses "Super Tuesday II."

In Texas, a Houston rally was held on February 10 in support of Clinton. On February 12, according to CBS, Hillary received a "rock star welcome" when she spoke before a crowd of 12,000 at the University of Texas at El Paso.

In Ohio, polls released on February 13 indicated that Clinton had a 17-point lead. She gained the endorsement of Ohio Governor Ted Strickland and Ohio First Lady Frances Strickland, of astronaut and former Senator John Glenn, and of Akron mayor Don Plusquellic. She also gained the endorsement of the Columbus Dispatch. In mid February Chelsea Clinton's campaigning for her mother included visits to Cleveland State University, the University of Akron Ohio State, and Ohio Wesleyan.

In Rhode Island, a February 13 Brown University poll for the state indicated Clinton was the choice of 36 percent of voters surveyed while Obama was supported by 28 percent.

As Obama solidified his lead, Clinton shook things up with a revamped message and sharper digs at her party's front man on February 20, 2008.

However, in the February 21 Democratic debate at the University of Texas at Austin, the next-to-last one of the campaign, Clinton generally refrained from attacking Obama. Clinton's closing statement in the debate drew praise from political analysts and a standing ovation from the audience. A police officer was killed February 22, 2008, in a motorcycle accident as Clinton's motorcade made its way through downtown Dallas. A visibly angry Clinton lashed out February 22 at Obama over campaign literature that she said he knows is "blatantly false". At the same time, a New York Times report portrayed her as still fighting, but philosophical and realistic about the possibility that she would lose the race. With only a week left in the race a February 26 New York Times report by political correspondent Patrick Healy stated that Clinton had developed a new "kitchen sink strategy" to confronting Obama which involved a slew of negative campaign attacks on Obama's experience and especially his readiness to be commander in chief. This began with a February 25 speech at George Washington University on foreign policy with Clinton comparing Obama's foreign policy inexperience to President George W. Bush.

With a week and a half to go, both Ohio and Texas tightened: An ABC News/Washington Post poll taken February 16–20 indicated that Clinton's lead over Obama in Ohio had shrunk to 7 percentage points. Another poll, released February 25, projected also a statistical dead heat in Texas between the two. On February 25 USA Today/Gallup poll showed that Obama had a double-digit lead for the first time, and a CBS News/New York Times poll showed an even larger Obama lead.

In the last scheduled debate of the campaign, at Cleveland State University on February 26, Clinton and Obama argued with each other over negative campaigning, health care and free trade. Clinton personally echoed a theme her campaign had emphasized over the past days, that media coverage on her was much tougher than that on Obama, by making reference to a Saturday Night Live skit on the same point from the weekend before. New York Times writer Alessandra Stanley said that the debate, hosted by MSNBC and featuring grillings from Tim Russert, "did look a bit like the 'S.N.L.' parody." Hillary Clinton and Barack Obama battled for votes over the airwaves and on the ground in Texas on February 29. Hillary Clinton met her match while appearing on NBC's "Saturday Night Live" to deliver the show's trademark opening line and provide an "editorial response" to a mock presidential debate. On March 2, 2008, Hillary Clinton tried to convince Ohio voters they have what it takes to fix the economy as they campaigned before contests that could decide the Democratic presidential nomination. The state's 3.6 million eligible Hispanic voters could tip the balance in delegate-rich Texas toward Hillary Clinton or Barack Obama. But they're deeply divided. Clinton relied on a loyal grass-roots network of community leaders.

One of the most controversial and upfront moves of the so-called "kitchen sink" strategy against Obama had been an ad entitled "Children" which Clinton aired in Texas concerning a 3 am phone call at the White House during a world crisis and touting Clinton's national security credentials. Many political commentators compared the Clinton ad to one used in the 1984 Democratic primary by Walter Mondale against Gary Hart. Obama responded with a similar ad on the same day claiming that Clinton lacked the judgment to deal with a world crisis because of her vote for the Iraq War. Clinton gave her harshest rebuke of Obama yet on March 3 when she repeatedly stated that she and Senator McCain had foreign policy experience while Obama only had a speech. The Obama campaign responded asking what foreign policy experience Clinton truly had. Hillary Clinton said March 17, 2008, she is the only candidate who would exercise the leadership needed to end the Iraq War. Sen. Barack Obama holds up his original opposition to the war on the campaign trail, but he didn't start working aggressively to end the war.

Clinton broke the 12-state winning streak for Obama with her victory in Rhode Island 58%/40%. The state had Clinton leading in the polls, though her lead had been narrowing in the days leading up to the primary. Clinton also won the Ohio primary 54%/44% and the Texas primary 51%/47%. She lost Vermont 59%/39% and the Texas Caucus 56%/44% with 41% reporting. Overall, Obama secured 99 Texas delegates, while Clinton earned 94. Clinton's wins in Ohio and Texas resulted in large part from her gaining back her core demographic areas of support, such as women and lower-income groups.

The day after, on March 5, Clinton raised the possibility on several morning news programs of a joint ticket with Obama, saying: "That may be where this is headed. But, of course, we have to decide who is on the top of ticket. I think the people of Ohio very clearly said that it should be me." Soon after, in Wyoming, Obama explicitly rejected the notion, saying "You won't see me as a Vice Presidential candidate."

Wyoming and Mississippi
The Wyoming caucus was held on March 8, 2008, with Senator Obama winning by 61% of the vote compared to Clinton's 38%. President Bill Clinton and daughter Chelsea had campaigned in the state, and Hillary Clinton made a Wyoming appearance the day before the caucuses. The Clinton campaign had continued to criticize Senator Obama's inexperience with what one Clinton aide called the "kitchen sink" strategy – throwing everything at Obama in the days leading up to the March 4 primaries in Ohio and Texas. The Obama campaign was seen as "off balance" by former John Edwards campaign manager Joe Trippi in an interview with New York Magazine because many problems mired the Obama campaign after its Ohio and Texas losses, Trippi expressed concern that Obama's negative counter-attack strategy could backfire. Earlier in the week the campaign of Republican nominee John McCain attacked a gaffe by Obama's foreign policy advisor Susan Rice on MSNBC's "Tucker," wherein she said that neither Obama nor Clinton was "ready to receive that 3 am call," referring to Clinton's Texas attack ad. Obama was also hurt by news that foreign policy advisor Samantha Power had called Clinton a "monster" in an interview with Scottish newspaper The Scotsman. Power subsequently resigned from the campaign. Obama responded to the re-vamped Clinton "kitchen sink" strategy by raising Senator Clinton's reluctance to release her tax returns, with campaign manager David Plouffe calling Clinton "one of the most secretive politicians in America today". Clinton spokesman Howard Wolfson responded to the attacks by comparing Obama to former special prosecutor Kenneth Starr.

The Clinton campaign continued to hint that a Clinton victory would entail Obama being chosen as vice Presidential running mate, and on March 8, former President Bill Clinton made known his support of this as a "dream ticket" which would be an "almost unstoppable force" However, the day before, in Casper, Wyoming, Senator Obama had explicitly rejected this notion. On March 10, Obama noted that he, not Senator Clinton, held the lead in delegates won. "I don't know how somebody who is in second place is offering the vice presidency to somebody who is in first place," he said. He further stated that Clinton's VP suggestion was an example of what he called "the old okey-doke", telling a Columbus, MS crowd that the Clinton camp was trying to "bamboozle" or "hoodwink" voters. Obama inquired why the Clinton campaign believed him competent for Vice President, but not as President.

The Mississippi Primary was held on March 11, 2008, with Obama winning 61% of the vote to Clinton's 37%. It was notable that the Mississippi results were largely divided by racial lines with exit polls by CNN showing Obama winning 91% of the black vote while 72% of the white vote went to Clinton.

Ferraro comments and resignation
On March 7, 2008, the 1984 Democratic vice-presidential nominee and Clinton finance committee member Geraldine Ferraro, gave an interview to the small California newspaper Daily Breeze in which she said, "I think what America feels about a woman becoming president takes a very secondary place to Obama's campaign – to a kind of campaign that it would be hard for anyone to run against. For one thing, you have the press, which has been uniquely hard on her. It's been a very sexist media. Some just don't like her. The others have gotten caught up in the Obama campaign. If Obama was a white man, he would not be in this position. And if he was a woman (of any color) he would not be in this position. He happens to be very lucky to be who he is. And the country is caught up in the concept." Ferraro justified her statements by referring to her own run for vice president saying that she "was talking about historic candidacies and what I started off by saying (was that) if you go back to 1984 and look at my historic candidacy, which I had just talked about all these things, in 1984 if my name was Gerard Ferraro instead of Geraldine Ferraro, I would have never been chosen as a vice presidential candidate. It had nothing to do with my qualification."

By the day of the March 11 Mississippi primary, the comments had achieved wider circulation and she was accused of being racially insensitive. Hillary Clinton rejected Ferraro's comments – saying, "It is regrettable that any of our supporters on both sides, because we've both had that experience, say things that kind of veer off into the personal. We ought to keep this on the issues" – but did not call for Ferraro's resignation from the Clinton campaign. Ferraro rejected apologizing or repudiating her comments once they came under fire from the Obama campaign, and spoke to the Daily Breeze again, where she said, "I really think they're attacking me because I'm white. How's that?"

On March 12, MSNBC commentator Keith Olbermann launched an unusually vehement critique of the Clinton campaign, accusing the campaign of using Ferraro as a surrogate to imply that Obama (who was president of Harvard Law Review at Harvard Law School during his time there and is a magna cum laude graduate of its law school) was the beneficiary of social and media affirmative action. Some commentators saw these comments by Ferraro as a coded attempt by the campaign to appeal to race-conscious white voters in the upcoming Pennsylvania primary. Later on March 12, Ferraro resigned from the Clinton campaign, saying "The Obama campaign is attacking me to hurt you. I won't let that happen." At a campaign stop with the National Newspaper Publishers Association which represents over 200 African American newspapers, Clinton was asked to apologize for Ferraro's remarks and said, "I said yesterday that I rejected what she said, and I certainly do repudiate it."

Comments about 1996 Bosnia trip
During her presidential campaign, Clinton had made several references to her March 1996 trip to visit U.S. troops enforcing the Dayton Agreement in Bosnia-Herzegovina, detailing a harrowing experience. At a February 29, 2008, event in Waco, Texas, with retired Gen. Wesley Clark and remarks at a December 29, 2007, event in Dubuque, Iowa, Clinton detailed how she had to make a run for it on the tarmac at Tuzla Air Base to avoid sniper fire. On March 17, 2008, during her Saint Patrick's Day speech at The George Washington University, Clinton described her trip to Bosnia:

The Associated Press could find no evidence that Clinton had been under extraordinary risk during her landing at Tuzla Air Base. A video of her arrival, released by CBS News, shows Clinton and her daughter Chelsea smiling and waving as they walked at a leisurely pace across the tarmac from a cargo plane, stopping to shake hands with Bosnia's acting president and listen while an 8-year-old girl read a poem. Clinton shook hands with American troops and posed for pictures with a group of 7th graders who were also on the tarmac. Comedian Sinbad, who accompanied Clinton on the trip, said, "I never felt that I was in a dangerous position. I never felt being in a sense of peril, or 'Oh, God, I hope I'm going to be OK when I get out of this helicopter or when I get out of his tank.'" When spokesman Howard Wolfson was asked about her remarks, he said that she "misspoke". CBS News reported that hundreds of thousands of viewers had by then seen video of the 1996 event that offers evidence of Clinton's exaggeration, with Clinton aide Lissa Muscatine saying the event "was not quite as dramatic as Clinton put it." Clinton acknowledged her mistake, saying "I made a mistake. That happens. It proves I'm human, which you know, for some people, is a revelation." The Obama campaign responded by releasing documentation of three other instances in the past in which Clinton had repeated the same sniper fire claim.

Campaign finance
The Clinton campaign had $33 million on hand at the end of February 2008, but due to federal election laws, would only be able to spend $11 million of that on the Democratic primary. As of the end of February, the campaign owed $8.7 million in unpaid debts. The campaign has also been slow paying vendors, drawing criticism from small business owners who have provided services to the campaign.

A February 8, 2008, article in the Portsmouth Herald stated, "Rochester physician Terry Bennett said he rented a city building to people who worked for Sen. Hillary Clinton's presidential campaign – and skipped town without paying the bill. Making matters worse, Bennett said, the  building at 236 Union St. was left trashed...Realtor Michael Whitney... said he has been trying to collect rent for four weeks. 'I sent about 20 e-mails,' said Whitney. '...I called, but they will not return any of my calls.'"

A February 23, 2008, article in The New York Times reported that a caterer, a hotel, and a cleaning service all had trouble collecting money from Clinton's campaign for services that they had provided.

A March 31, 2008, article in The Politico titled "Clinton didn't pay health insurance bills" stated, "Among the debts reported this month by Hillary Clinton's struggling presidential campaign, the $292,000 in unpaid health insurance premiums for her campaign staff stands out... the unpaid bills to Aetna were at least two months old, according to FEC filings."

After Clinton's April win in the Pennsylvania primary by 9.4%, her campaign released to the media that it had received a renewed national boost, as evidenced by 60,000 donors who contributed a total of $10 million, more than 80 percent of whom the campaign said were first-time donors. An investigation from The Politico, however, concluded that the claim was only "successful campaign spin," and "a case of shaping favorable media coverage by crafting a narrative too compelling to overlook." Politico concluded this because the campaign's claims, it said, were "impossible to independently verify." Data released by the Federal Election Commission revealed that the real figure was approximately $4.3 million.

A May 12, 2008, Bloomberg News article states that Clinton has "more than $10 million in unpaid bills to vendors and consultants."

An August 22, 2008, CNN blog entry by CNN reporters Alexander Mooney and Robert Yoon stated, "According to an FEC report filed Wednesday, Clinton's debt as of the end of July stood at just under $24 million – a decrease of only $1.2 million since the end of June. More than $13 million of that total is owed to the New York senator herself, while close to $11 million is owed to individual vendors."

NAFTA position
During her campaign, Clinton repeatedly criticized the North American Free Trade Agreement, despite it having been one of the major achievements of her husband's administration, and said that as First Lady she had been against the agreement. Her opposition to NAFTA had been a key issue in the Ohio primary.

The mid-March release of Clinton administration White House calendar documents that suggested that Hillary Clinton had participated in several meetings during 1993 to promote NAFTA's passage within Congress led to the Obama campaign accusing her of mendacity. Obama advisor David Axelrod said the documents provided "direct, incontrovertible evidence" that the First Lady worked for NAFTA's passage and that "This is the political equivalent of consumer fraud." The NAFTA matter thus became one of several where Clinton's credibility was being called into question.

Thereupon followed a range of remembrances from Clinton administration officials involved at the time. David Gergen and Robert J. Shapiro said she had opposed NAFTA on the merits, as well as for getting too high political priority compared to the Clinton health care reform plan, an assessment that was echoed by biographers Sally Bedell Smith and Carl Bernstein. Others such as Robert Reich recalled only her opposition to the priority and not to the agreement herself. In any case, once her husband had made the decision to support NAFTA, she did publicly support that.

Tax return disclosure
On April 4, the Clintons released their tax returns for the past eight years. The total reported income for the time period was $109 million, most of which came from Bill Clinton's books, speaking engagements, and other enterprises. The Clintons paid $34 million in federal taxes over the period.

Health insurance story
In early April, the Clinton campaign had problems arising from Clinton's use of a story of health insurance coverage, an Ohio hospital, and a patient's death. Based upon a story Clinton had heard from a Meigs County sheriff's deputy in Pomeroy, Ohio, in February, but had not had fact-checked, Clinton described a woman from rural Ohio who was making minimum wage at a local pizza shop, was uninsured, and became pregnant. As told, there were complications with the pregnancy and the woman was denied treatment at a local hospital because she couldn't afford a $100 payment; she later was taken to the hospital by ambulance and lost the baby; she was then taken by helicopter to a Columbus hospital where she died of complications. Clinton used the story through April 4 in Grand Forks, North Dakota. Officials at O'Bleness Memorial Hospital in Athens, Ohio, said the woman did have insurance and had not been turned away; they expressed frustration that Clinton's campaign never called to verify the story, and asked that Clinton stop telling it. In fact, the woman had been earlier denied treatment at a private clinic because she owed them several thousand dollars from unpaid previous visits, and so thought she could not go to the clinic again once she became pregnant, even though she now had insurance. Thus she did not seek medical care until she was already in an emergency situation. On April 6, the Clinton campaign indicated it would drop use of the story. On April 11, Paul Krugman wrote a column in the New York Times saying the essential point about the poor state of health care in the United States was lost in the media storm about this episode and that Clinton's point about a pregnant woman who died after being turned away was essentially correct.

Pennsylvania

Hillary Clinton and Barack Obama would both statistically tie Republican John McCain in a general election matchup, according to a CNN/Opinion Research Corporation poll released March 18, 2008. At the same time, daily tracking polls from Rasmussen Reports showed McCain with a lead over both Democratic candidates. The National Archives on March 19, 2008, released more than 11,000 pages of Sen. Hillary Clinton's schedule when she was first lady. Sen. Barack Obama's campaign has pushed for the documents' release, arguing that their review is necessary to make a full evaluation of Clinton's experience as first lady.

The Pennsylvania Primary will be held on April 22. With 188 delegates, one Pennsylvania newspaper said that the state is "poised to become decisive in the Democratic presidential nomination."

President Bill Clinton highlighted the importance of the state for the Clinton campaign saying on March 11 at an event in Western Pennsylvania that "If she wins a big, big victory in Pennsylvania, I think it'll give her a real big boost going into the next primaries... I think she's got to win a big victory in Pennsylvania. I think if she does, she can be nominated, but it's up to you." This was a repetition of his tactic before March 4, warning supporters that his wife might not be able to continue if she did not win Ohio and Texas. Hillary Clinton emphasized that Pennsylvania was something of a home state for her, as her father came from Scranton, Pennsylvania, she and her brothers were christened there and had vacationed near there each summer, and her brothers still maintained the family cottage near there.

A February 14 Quinnipiac University Polling Institute poll placed Clinton ahead of Obama 52% to 36%. Another poll, released two weeks later, saw that margin decreasing, with Clinton leading Obama by 6 points, at 49% to 43%. As April began, Clinton's lead had been virtually wiped out in the state. A poll from Public Policy Polling had Obama two points ahead, while an Insider Advantage poll showed Clinton hanging on to a two-point advantage. Both results were within the margins of error, making the state a virtual dead heat. Another late-March poll from Quinnipiac University had Clinton nine points ahead.

On March 27, Senator Patrick Leahy of Vermont called for Clinton to withdraw from the presidential campaign and support opponent Barack Obama. The six-term senator, and chair of the Senate Judiciary Committee made the statements during an interview on Vermont Public Radio. Leahy stated: "Senator Clinton has every right, but not a very good reason, to remain a candidate for as long as she wants to. As far as the delegate count and the interests of a Democratic victory in November go, there is not a very good reason for drawing this out." Clinton rejected calls to withdraw, saying "The more people get a chance to vote, the better it is for our democracy...we of all people [know] how important it [is] to give everyone a chance to have their voices heard and their votes counted." Campaigning in the week of April 14, 2008, included a tough debate between Obama and Clinton, who pounded her rival for his recent remark that decades of economic decline had left some rural voters "bitter" and clinging to religion and guns.

On April 22, she won the Pennsylvania primary by 9.2 percentage points, keeping her campaign alive and bringing in a much-needed $4.3 million in new funds over the next 24 hours, although the campaign claimed the figure was $10 million. Weekly churchgoers made up almost 36 percent of the electorate, who went to Clinton by a 56–44 margin. More than a third were gun owners, and they preferred Clinton by an almost-identical margin—60 percent to 40 percent, exit polls found out. The victory showed she had the better shot at winning on November 4, 2008, than he, she stated. A total of 158 delegates to the convention were at stake.

North Carolina and Indiana
In a series of political ads and speeches while campaigning in Indiana, Clinton blamed the closing and move of Magnequench in Valparaiso, Indiana, a company that manufactures military-grade magnets used in smart weapons on the Bush administration. However, the company's sale to a Chinese company was approved under the administration of her husband Bill Clinton in 1995 despite national security concerns. A memo from the office of Indiana Senator Evan Bayh, who is also a supporter of Clinton, revealed that Bayh blamed the Clintons for the closing of the Magnequench plant.

Clinton was heavily outspent by Obama in both states.

Clinton made her proposal of a summer gas tax holiday a central part of her campaigning. Obama opposed the notion, and it became a major issue between them. When most economists came out against the proposal, Clinton denounced "elite opinion" and said, "I'm not going to put my lot in with economists."

On May 6, a narrow win in the Indiana primary coupled with a large loss in the North Carolina primary, damaged Clinton's campaign's chances and led to speculation about whether she could or would remain in the race. Clinton had hoped to score a solid win in Indiana and finish a close second in North Carolina, especially after Obama had endured a difficult period in his campaign due to continuing effects from the Jeremiah Wright controversy. As the results came in from these two states, ABC political analyst and former top Bill Clinton aide George Stephanopoulos declared the Democratic race "over", and NBC Washington Bureau Chief Tim Russert said, "We now know who the Democratic nominee will be." The day after the North Carolina and Indiana votes, it appeared that superdelegates and party leaders were beginning to coalesce around Obama. He added four superdelegate endorsements to Clinton's one, and former Democratic presidential candidate George McGovern switched his support from Clinton to Obama. Regardless, Clinton vowed that her campaign would continue through the remaining primary states, and she loaned it an additional $6.4 million from her own funds.

West Virginia
Clinton expressed her rationale for staying in the race by saying, "I have a much broader base to build a winning coalition on ... [there is an Associated Press article] that found how Sen. Obama's support among working, hard-working Americans, white Americans, is weakening again, and how whites in both states who had not completed college were supporting me. There's a pattern emerging here." The bluntness of her demographic analysis garnered some attention, and Clinton aides later said she regretted the remarks. When Congressman Charles Rangel, a strong Clinton supporter, said "that was the dumbest thing she could have said," Clinton acknowledged that "he's probably right."

Campaigning for the coming primaries, the Clinton campaign was forced to economize in its presentation values. While Internet and conventional fundraising continued, it fell far short of the burst she had received after her Pennsylvania win.

Ahead of the West Virginia vote, Obama took the lead in committed superdelegates on May 9. Obama had picked up seven endorsements from superdelegates since the May 6 primaries. Recognizing that the nature of the contest had changed, Clinton largely eliminated mention or criticism of Obama from her stump speeches and advertisements.

Clinton won the state by a 41-percentage-point margin, and told supporters that she was "more determined than ever to carry on in this campaign". After exit polls revealed that large numbers of Clinton supporters were planning to vote for John McCain rather than Obama should she lose the nomination, Clinton said it would be a "terrible mistake" for those voters to do so: "I'm going to work my heart out for whoever our nominee is. Obviously, I'm still hoping to be that nominee, but I'm going to do everything I can to make sure that anyone who supported me ... understands what a grave error it would be not to vote for Sen. Obama."

After winning West Virginia, the Clinton campaign claimed a lead in the popular vote. The math behind this claim required (1) excluding the caucus states of Iowa, Nevada, Maine, and Washington; (2) including the disputed Florida totals; (3) including the disputed Michigan totals; (4) allotting 0 votes to Obama in Michigan. By that calculation, Clinton was ahead by roughly 27,000 votes of 33.4 million cast, or 0.08%. CNN noted that "Four different scenarios of the total popular vote have been kicked around," and that Obama led under all four scenarios. Clinton was ahead only under a fifth scenario excluding caucus states.

Kentucky and Oregon
Obama continued to add to his superdelegate lead in the week before the May 20 Kentucky and Oregon primaries, and former Democratic candidate John Edwards endorsed Obama on May 14.

On May 20, Clinton won the Kentucky primary by a 35-point margin, while losing the Oregon primary by 18 points. With the results, Obama gained a majority of all the pledged delegates to the convention.

With Obama approaching victory in the nomination process, Clinton continued to avoid attacking him. The campaigns had not yet begun discussing what Clinton might want in any concession negotiation. Bill Clinton began strongly pushing for Obama to take Hillary Clinton as his vice presidential running mate.

RFK remark controversy
While campaigning in South Dakota on May 23, Clinton responded to questions about why there was pressure on her to leave the race:

Clinton's mention of the 1968 assassination of Robert F. Kennedy in the context of her rationale for staying in the race drew a quick storm of national attention, as well as strong criticism from the Obama campaign. By the end of the day, Clinton issued an apology, saying that the Kennedys were on her mind due to the recent medical condition of Ted Kennedy and that she only used the example because of the June timeline, not, as speculated, to imply an Obama assassination. She had made a similar remark to Time magazine in March.

The following day Obama said he would give Clinton the benefit of the doubt, adding, "I have learned that when you are campaigning for as many months as Senator Clinton and I have been campaigning, sometimes you get careless in terms of the statements that you make. And I think that is what happened here." Throughout the Memorial Day weekend, the Clinton campaign sought to do damage control over the remarks, arguing more strongly that her remarks had been deliberately taken out of context by the news media and the Obama campaign. Campaign spokesperson Howard Wolfson said, "It was unfortunate and unnecessary, and in my opinion, inflammatory, for the Obama campaign to attack Senator Clinton on Friday for these remarks, without obviously knowing the full facts or context."

Clinton was also criticized for exaggerating the meaningful duration of her husband's 1992 campaign; while he did not clinch the nomination until June of that year, he had effectively won it by mid-March.

Florida and Michigan resolution
At a meeting of the Democratic National Committee Rules & Bylaws Committee held in Washington, D.C., on May 31, 2008, decisions were made regarding seating delegates from the Michigan primary and Florida primary.

The Florida delegation was seated by following the results of the primary, but with each delegate having one-half vote in consequence of the penalty for holding the primary too early. This gave Clinton 105 pledged delegates (52.5 votes), Obama 67 delegates (33.5 votes), and Edwards 13 delegates (6.5 votes). The Florida resolution was acceptable to all sides and approved by a committee vote of 27 to 0.

The Michigan resolution was less obvious, since only Clinton of the major candidates had been on the ballot. The same half-vote penalty was employed, then a formulation was devised wherein the Michigan delegation was seated with 69 delegates (34.5 votes) pledged to Clinton and 59 delegates (29.5 votes) for Obama. This gave Obama four more delegates than the primary results would have warranted, assuming that all "uncommitted" votes were for Obama. The Michigan resolution was approved by a vote of 19 to 8. Harold M. Ickes, a strong supporter and representative of Clinton, objected strongly to the resolution, saying: "This motion will hijack – hijack – remove four delegates won by Hillary Clinton. This body of 30 individuals has decided that they're going to substitute their judgment for 600,000 voters." He then announced that Clinton reserved the right to appeal the Michigan resolution to the DNC Credentials Committee and thus possibly to the Democratic National Convention.

The meeting was conducted before a boisterous audience of candidate supporters, mostly pro-Clinton.

Puerto Rico, South Dakota, Montana
The final three primaries took place in early June. The Clinton campaign knew the end was near, but enjoyed the time spent at events in Puerto Rico, and Clinton spoke of the virtue of "finishing the job."

On June 1, Clinton won the Puerto Rico primary by more than a 2-to-1 margin. Later on June 3, Clinton won the South Dakota primary and Obama won the Montana primary. This was the final primary of the season.

Obama becomes the presumptive presidential nominee
A flurry of superdelegates declared for Obama on June 3, and that combined with the day's winning of new pledged delegates in the two primaries, meant Obama had gained enough delegates to become the presumptive presidential nominee.

Following the result, after rumors fueled by a misunderstanding of an Associated Press report, the campaign dismissed suggestions that Clinton was going to concede in the speech following the primaries. In her speech after the closing of the Montana polls, Clinton said "I will be making no decisions tonight." She invited Americans to write to her on her website to provide input into what her next steps should be.

Meanwhile, while not officially confirming interest in the vice presidential slot, Clinton hinted at the possibility earlier on June 3. When asked for clarification, her campaign released the statement "Today on a conference call with New York legislators, Sen. Clinton was asked whether she was open to the idea of running as vice president and repeated what she has said before: She would do whatever she could to ensure that Democrats take the White House back and defeat John McCain." The vice presidential possibility had been raised by Bill Clinton in the previous month, but this fueled speculation that Hillary Clinton was definitively interested in the possibility.

The New York Times described the relationship between Obama and Clinton during the campaign as having "veered between strained and strange", and suggested that the manner in which Obama reacted to Clinton and her supporters would be a major test of the post-primaries period.

By June 4, several media networks and top Clinton aides confirmed that she had been planning to concede the race for the Democratic nomination and endorse Obama. By June 5, the Clinton camp backed away from any suggestion about the vice presidential slot, with Clinton's spokesperson saying "[she] is not seeking the vice presidency, and no one speaks for her but her. The choice here is Senator Obama's and his alone."

End of campaign
On June 7, 2008, in a speech before her gathered supporters at the National Building Museum in Washington, D.C., Clinton officially announced that she was suspending her campaign and was fully endorsing Barack Obama. Clinton said:

Clinton also adopted Obama's signature slogan, "Yes We Can", in her concession speech.

Obama responded to the speech in a number of venues. Shortly after she gave it, Obama stated that he was "thrilled and honored" to be supported by Clinton. In North Carolina on June 9, 2008, Obama began his speech by praising Clinton. He stated:

Obama also thanked Clinton on his website and asked his supporters to do so as well via a special page designated for that task. In addition, at a rally in Michigan on June 16, Obama defended Clinton as she was being heckled by some members of the audience, stating that "she is worthy of our respect, she is worthy of our honor."

The 2014 book HRC: State Secrets and the Rebirth of Hillary Clinton says that as the campaign wound down, a handful of staffers were tasked with compiling a list of Democrats based on their perceived loyalty or disloyalty during the campaign.

Vice-presidential selection and convention

After conceding defeat to Obama, Clinton's name was mentioned exhaustively by speculators and party officials as a possible running mate for the Illinois senator; the potential ticket was dubbed "the Dream Team", "the Dream Ticket", and "the Unity Ticket" in some quarters. However, she was never seriously considered or vetted by Obama for the position. Ultimately, Obama selected Delaware Senator Joe Biden over Clinton and a number of other rumored candidates, including Texas Rep. Chet Edwards, Kansas Gov. Kathleen Sebelius, Indiana Sen. Evan Bayh (an early and prominent Clinton supporter), and Virginia Gov. Tim Kaine; the announcement was reported by CNN after midnight (U.S. Eastern Time) on August 22.

During the Democratic National Convention, Clinton released her delegates and urged them to vote for Barack Obama. On August 27, 2008, she motioned that Sen. Obama be officially nominated by acclamation.

See also
 Hillary Clinton 2008 presidential campaign
 2008 Democratic Party presidential primaries
 Results of the 2008 Democratic Party presidential primaries

References

Primary
2008 United States Democratic presidential primaries